Bassecoia is a genus of flowering plants belonging to the family Caprifoliaceae. It is also in the subfamily of Dipsacoideae.

Its native range is Nepal to Southern Central China and Northern Indo-China.

Known species:
Bassecoia bretschneideri 
Bassecoia hookeri 
Bassecoia siamensis

References

Caprifoliaceae
Caprifoliaceae genera